The Institution of Railway Signal Engineers (IRSE) is a worldwide professional body for all those engaged or interested in railway signalling and telecommunications (S&T) and allied disciplines.

Local sections 
The IRSE is based in London, with international sections in:
 Australasia
 Hong Kong
 India
 Japan
 The Netherlands
 North America
 Singapore
 Southern Africa
 Switzerland
 Malaysia
 Indonesia
 France
 Thailand

In the UK:
 London and South East
 Midland and North Western
 Plymouth
 Scottish
 Western
 York

There is also a Minor Railways section specialising in railways that are not part of the national network, including industrial, tourist and heritage railways.

Additionally there is a Younger Members section which aims to contribute to and improve the benefits that the IRSE provides for its younger members, which includes the co-ordination of a number of events each year.

Membership grades 
Membership grade is dependent on the individual member's experience and / or formal qualification.

 Affiliate
 Accredited Technician
 Associate Member
 Member
 Fellow
 Companion

Headquarters 
The headquarters of the IRSE is in Westminster, London, in the offices of the Institution of Mechanical Engineers.

Notable Members 
Elsie Louisa Winterton became the IRSE's first woman member in 1923, whilst working as a draughtswoman for the Great Western Railway.

IRSE Licensing Scheme 
The IRSE Licensing Scheme was introduced in 1994 as a means of competence certification for people undertaking work in the railway signalling and telecommunications industry. There are over 50 licence categories that cover the design, installation, testing, maintenance and engineering management of both railway signalling and telecommunications. Possession of a licence (or evidence that you are working towards obtaining a licence) is essential for people who want to carry out S&T engineering work for Network Rail or London Underground. Network Rail and London Underground require themselves and their contractors and consultants, ensure that all S&T engineers engaged in safety-critical and safety-related work possess IRSE licences.

Publications 
 IRSE News  – a near monthly journal featuring technical articles and papers, as well as articles of general interest to the signalling community.

See also
 Railway Industry Association

References

External links 
 
 Unofficial discussion forum for those considering taking the IRSE professional examination.

1912 establishments in the United Kingdom
Institution of Mechanical Engineers
Organisations based in the City of Westminster
Organizations established in 1912
Railway Signal Engineers
Rail infrastructure in the United Kingdom
Railway signalling